Pomaderris hamiltonii is a species of plant in the family Rhamnaceae. It is endemic to New Zealand. Commonly known as kūmarahou or pale flowered kūmarahou because of its pale brown flowers.

References

Flora of New Zealand
hamiltonii
Near threatened plants
Taxonomy articles created by Polbot